Keeseekoose 66-KE-04 is an Indian reserve of the Keeseekoose First Nation in Saskatchewan. It is 15 kilometres east of Canora. In the 2016 Canadian Census, it was recorded as uninhabited.

References

Indian reserves in Saskatchewan
Division No. 9, Saskatchewan